The Davao River Bridge, also known as the Ma-a Bridge is a six-lane road bridge in Davao City.

Background
The Davao River Bridge is a road bridge which has six lanes. It connects the barangays of Ma-a and Buhangin of Davao City. It is part of the Davao City Diversion Road.

SInce the 2010s renovation, the bridge has the daily capacity to 31,576 motorists.

History

2015-2018 renovations
A bridge widening project for the Davao River Bridge in 2015 to widen the bridge from having two lanes to six lanes. In the first year of the widening project, right-of-way and technical issues were encountered forcing the implementation of widening plans to be moved to the upstream portion of the bridge. The widening at the upstream portion of the bridge completed in 2017 was conducted by Vicente T. Lao Construction.

For the second phase of the bridge widening project, a joint venture by Roma Construction and Development Corporation and Bislig Venture and Development Inc. conducted the widening of the bridge in its downstream portion from 2017 to 2018. The whole project was completed on April 18, 2018 and the bridge was inaugurated by Philippine President Rodrigo Duterte on May 24, 2018.

The abutments were also reinforced, reflectorized thermoplastic pavement markings were installed, sidewalks were added, and craneway steel component and asphalt overlay were included in the  renovation works.

References

Davao City
Bridges in the Philippines